The Saqifa of the Banu Sa'ida clan refers to the location of an event in early Islam where some of the companions of the Islamic prophet Muhammad pledged their allegiance to Abu Bakr as the first caliph and successor to Muhammad shortly after his death in 11 AH (632 CE). The Saqifa meeting is among the most controversial events in early Islam, due to the exclusion of a large number of Muhammad's companions, including his immediate family and notably Ali, his cousin and son-in-law. The conflicts after Muhammad's death are considered as the roots of the current division among Muslims. Those who accepted Abu Bakr's caliphate were later labeled Sunnis, while the supporters of Ali's right to caliphate went on to form the Shia.

Historiography 
The Arabic word  denotes a covered communal place for conversation but the term is synonymous in historical texts with the specific meeting immediately after Muhammad's death in which his succession was debated.

Biased reports 
The earliest reports about the Saqifa affair were put into writing in the first half of the second century AH or later. By this time, the Muslim community was firmly divided into Sunni and Shia camps. As a result, the reports of the Sunni Ibn Sa'd, al-Baladhuri, and even al-Tabari reflect the Sunni beliefs, while those authors with Shia sympathies favored their views, including Ibn Ishaq, al-Ya'qubi, and al-Mas'udi. Jafri thus emphasizes the need for surveying all reports to obtain a sound account of the event.

For instance, Ibn Sa'd presents a highly polemic account of the Saqifa affair in his Kitab al-Tabaqat al-kabir, where Ali is absent in particular. Jafri regards him as a pioneer of the Sunni "pious" technique, which preserves only the best qualities of companions and suppresses any controversial reports. Similarly, the late works of the Shia al-Tabarsi and al-Majlesi are polemic in nature with little historical value, claims Jafri.

Centrality of Ibn Ishaq 
The earliest report is that of Ibn Ishaq in his Sirat rasul Allah, the recension of which by the Sunni Ibn Hisham has reached us. Uncharacteristically, Ibn Hisham refrains from modifying Ibn Ishaq's account of the Saqifa affair, which is thus a report written by a Shia author and approved by a Sunni editor-critic. Ibn Ishaq's account is the basis of the contemporary studies of Jafri and Madelung.

Other authors 
In his Ansab al-ashraf, the Sunni al-Baladhuri partly follows Ibn Sa'd's pious technique but also retains some of the controversial material about the Saqifa event in favor of Ali. On the other hand, the contentious content in the work of the Shia al-Ya'qubi is often dismissed by later Sunni authors as fabricated, while Jafri views his work as a valuable collection of documents which survived the tendentious efforts of the Sunni majority historians, who largely suppressed or dismissed divergent views. Madelung similarly believes that the Shia or Sunni partiality of a report alone does not imply its fabrication. The account of the Saqifa meeting by al-Tabari is mostly balanced and unbiased, notes Jafri, and the most detailed, writes Ayoub.

Ibn Abbas 
The main narrator of the Saqifa event is Ibn Abbas, Muhammad's cousin and an authority in Medina's scholarly circles. He witnessed the event himself and also received the first-hand account of his father Abbas, who was politically active then. Madelung accepts the authenticity of Ibn Abbas' narration, noting that it reflects his characteristic view point. The bulk of Ibn Abbas' narration concerns a Friday sermon by Umar in 23/644. Though this is omitted from most Sunni reports, Madelung and Jafri are confident that the second caliph delivered the speech to discourage those who might have planned to back Ali's nomination as caliph after Umar.

Event 

During Muhammad's lifetime, Muslims in Medina were divided into two groups: the Muhajirun, who had converted to Islam in Mecca and migrated to Medina with Muhammad, and the Ansar, who were originally from Medina and had invited Muhammad to govern their city.

Ansar's meeting 
In the immediate aftermath of Muhammad's death in 11/632, a gathering of the Ansar took place at the Saqifa of the Banu Sa'ida clan, while his close relatives prepared for the burial. The conventional wisdom is that the Ansar met there to decide on a new leader for the Muslim community among themselves, with the intentional exclusion of the Muhajirun. This is also what Umar stated in his speech. The leading candidate was possibly Sa'd ibn Ubada, a companion of Muhammad and a chief of the Banu Khazraj, the majority tribe of the Ansar, who was sick on that day.

For Madelung, the absence of the Muhajirun instead indicates that the Ansar met to re-establish their control over Medina under the belief that the Muhajirun would mostly return to Mecca after Muhammad. Alternatively, Jafri suspects that the Ansar met preemptively because they were fearful of Meccan domination and possibly aware of their designs for leadership.

Abu Bakr at the Saqifa 
Among three available traditions, Jafri chooses the one that appears in nearly all of his sources, according to which the news of the Saqifa meeting reached Abu Bakr, Umar, and Abu Ubaida when they were most likely in the house of Abu Ubaida, possibly to discuss the leadership crisis. Arnold and Jafri are confident that Abu Bakr and Umar had earlier planned or formed an alliance in anticipation of Muhammad's death, while Madelung attributes the planning only to Abu Bakr. In Ibn Ishaq's report, someone then informs Abu Bakr and Umar about the Saqifa meeting, "If you want to have command of the people, then take it before their [the Ansar's] action becomes serious." The two then rushed to the Saqifa, accompanied by Abu Ubaida, perhaps to prevent any unexpected development. Some encouraged the three men not to do so but they pressed on anyway, reports Umar.

Umar narrates that "the Muhajirun" joined Abu Bakr, and then Umar suggested they go to the Ansar gathered at the Saqifa. Madelung rejects this, noting that Abu Bakr, Umar, and Abu Ubaida were the only members of the Muhajirun in the Saqifa meeting, possibly accompanied by a few relatives and clients. For Madelung, the near absence of the Muhajirun at the Saqifa also explains why there are no other reports about the event, arguing that the Ansar must have been reluctant to recount their defeat later.

Abu Bakr's remarks 
Once there, Umar says he "realized that they [the Ansar] intended to cut us off from our root [i.e., the Quraysh] and to usurp the rule from us." Abu Bakr then rose and warned the Ansar that Arabs will not recognize the rule of anyone outside of Muhammad's tribe, the Quraysh. The Muhajirun, Abu Bakr argued, were the best of Arabs in lineage and location, as quoted by Ibn Ishaq. Abu Bakr also noted that the Muhajirun had accepted Islam earlier and were closer to Muhammad in kinship, adds al-Baladhuri. The Quraysh's relation with Muhammad is also noted by al-Ya'qubi and al-Tabari, and also by the contemporary Momen. Madelung, however, considers it unlikely that Abu Bakr brought up the Quraysh's kinship with Muhammad as that would have invited questions about the rights of the Banu Hashim, Muhammad's clan and his closest kin. 

Returning to Ibn Ishaq's account, Abu Bakr then reportedly invited the Ansar to choose Umar or Abu Ubaida as Muhammad's successor. Umar reports that he was displeased with this offer because he considered Abu Bakr to be more entitled to rulership than himself. Madelung regards this as a manoeuvre by Abu Bakr to present himself as an acceptable alternative to Umar and Abu Ubaida for the Ansar, adding that Abu Ubaida lacked prominence while Umar had apparently just discredited himself before the meeting by publicly denying Muhammad's death.

Violence at the Saqifa 
Ibn Ishaq's account continues that Habab ibn Mundhir, a veteran of the Battle of Badr, countered Abu Bakr with the suggestion that the Quraysh and the Ansar should choose their separate rulers among themselves. A heated argument then followed, reports Umar, until he asked Abu Bakr to stretch his hand and pledged allegiance to him. Others followed suit, he claims, adding that, "Then we jumped upon Sa'd until one of them called out: 'You killed Sa'd ibn Ubada.' I said, 'May God kill Sa'd.'" 

The outburst of violence at the Saqifa indicates that a substantial number of the Ansar must have initially refused to follow Umar's lead, writes Madelung. Otherwise, he argues, there would have been no need to beat up their chief Sa'd ibn Ubada. Sa'd remained defiant until his murder by a "jinn" during the reign of Umar, possibly at the instigation of the second caliph.

Ali

Absence from the Saqifa 
Muhammad's cousin and son-in-law was preparing Muhammad's body for burial, alongside other close relatives, and was likely unaware of the ongoing Saqifa meeting. Following Umar's pledge to Abu Bakr, the Saqifa account of the Kufan al-Nakha'i adds, "But the Ansar, or some of them, said: 'We will not swear allegiance to anyone but Ali.'" Caetani dismisses this report because of its Shia coloring, while Madelung accepts it, noting that al-Nakha'i is not known for Shia sympathies and his account is otherwise distinctly Sunni. Similarly, al-Ya'qubi writes that the Ansar al-Mundhir ibn Arqam interrupted the proceedings and nominated Ali for succession. The contemporary Jafri, Lalani, and Momen state that some advocated the case of Ali at the Saqifa.

Madelung is not certain whether the succession of Ali was discussed at the Saqifa but considers it likely, commenting that the Ansar would have naturally turned to Ali because of their family ties with the prophet. Umar in his sermon explained that they had pressed the Ansar for an immediate oath of allegiance at the Saqifa because, he claimed, they might have had otherwise elected one of their own to succeed Muhammad. Referring to this claim, Madelung suggests that Umar was partly fearful that the Ansar would put forward the case of Ali among themselves. This is also a proposal entertained by McHugo.

The case for Ali

Madelung is of the view that a broad , in which Ali was to be on option, would have inevitably led to the election of Ali: The Ansar would have supported Ali because of their family ties with Muhammad. Among the Muhajirun, the candidacy of Ali would have been supported by the powerful Abd Shams clan of the Quraysh because of their close ties with the Banu Hashim and despite their conflicts. Their chief Abu Sufyan indeed offered his support to Ali after the appointment of Abu Bakr, but was turned down by Ali who said he was concerned about the unity of the nascent Islam. The joint support of the Ansar and Abd Shams would have no doubt carried Ali to the caliphate, predicts Madelung. He adds that the straightforward logic of dynastic succession would have also prevailed in a general  in favor of Ali. Some others similarly consider it likely that Ali would have been elected in a formal assembly.

Merits 
In terms of merits, the same arguments that favored Abu Bakr over the Ansar (kinship, service to Islam, lineage, etc.) would have arguably favored Ali over Abu Bakr, as often evoked by Shia authors in support of Ali's right to succession. For Jafri, the Sunni arguments that justify Abu Bakr's caliphate on the basis that he led the prayer in Muhammad's final days reflect later theological developments. He also finds the related traditions to be confused and contradictory. In the same vein, Lecomte writes that Muhammad respected Abu Bakr but considers the prayer story inconclusive because it does not formally relate to the political leadership of the community. Shaban goes further and assigns no significance to the prayer story, saying that Muhammad had frequently delegated this task to others in the past.

Youth 
A common argument by Sunni and Western scholars is that the young Ali, aged about thirty at the time, could have not been a serious candidate for the caliphate. This is the view of Veccia Vaglieri, Lammens, and also Shaban, who suggests that Ali was untried for the responsibility. In contrast, Aslan argues that Ali regularly took key responsibilities despite his youth when Muhammad was alive. Alternatively, Madelung argues that Ali's youth would have only mattered if there had been an agreement on the hereditary succession to Muhammad.

In the Quran 

Families of the past prophets are given a prominent role in the Quran. After the past prophets, their kin are selected by God as the spiritual and material heirs to the prophets in the Quran. Muhammad's family (Ahl al-Bayt) similarly enjoys an eminent position in the Quran. As such, insofar as the Quran reflects the views of Muhammad, Madelung argues that he could have not seen his succession differently from the past prophets or considered Abu Bakr as his natural successor. Jafri develops a similar line of argument. This is also the Shia view.

Ali's views 

Veccia Vaglieri is uncertain whether Ali actually hoped to succeed Muhammad because he made no effort in Sunni sources to seize the rule, despite being advised to do so by Abbas and Abu Sufyan. Alternatively, Ayoub describes the mild opposition of Ali in Sunni sources as apologetic. He and some others maintain that Ali viewed himself as the most qualified person to lead the Muslim community after Muhammad by virtue of his merits and his kinship with Muhammad. These authors argue that Ali eventually relinquished his claims to the caliphate for the sake of the unity of a nascent Islam in crisis when it became clear that Muslims did not broadly support his cause. If the Muslim community favored Ali, Madelung suggests, he would have no longer considered the caliphate just as his right, but also as his duty. Indeed, in speeches and letters attributed to Ali, it is repeatedly emphasized that the leadership of the Muslim community is the prerogative of the family of Muhammad (Ahl al-Bayt). 

Mavani, Madelung, and Shah-Kazemi add that Ali further considered himself as the designated successor of Muhammad through a divine decree at the Ghadir Khumm. Ayoub disagrees, but concedes that Ali and some others indeed considered him as the most qualified to lead. To support his claims, Madelung cites a Sunni statement attributed to Ali when he pledged allegiance to Abu Bakr after a long delay. He also notes that Ali publicly referred to the Ghadir Khumm after his ascension to the caliphate in 656. Mavani similarly cites some Sunni and Shia reports, including the proceedings of the electoral council in 644 when Ali refused to be bound by the precedence of the first two caliphs. Another report by al-Tabari indicates that Ali again publicly excluded the practices of Abu Bakr and Umar from the Sunna (of Muhammad) when his supporters pledged their allegiance to him in Kufa. 

Madelung holds that Ali's views about succession mostly match the Shia beliefs today, and Lalani and Daftary have similar opinions, whereas Veccia Vaglieri considers the Shia beliefs fabricated because Ali "showed no inclination to legitimism." In contrast, Madelung and others detail the opposition of Ali to the appointment of Abu Bakr at the Saqifa. Yet Madelung also highlights some Sunni hadiths in which Ali reportedly praised Abu Bakr and Umar, while some others note the Sunni tendency to minimize and neutralize the conflicts among companions after Muhammad, particularly about the Saqifa affair. In  and some other early Shia sources, Ali contrasts the corruption of the third caliph, Uthman, with the political leadership of Abu Bakr and Umar, even though he rejects their religious legitimacy. A related example is the account of the negotiations before the Battle of Siffin (657) by Ibn Muzahim, which quotes Ali as saying that Abu Bakr and Umar had governed justly, even though they had assumed the caliphate wrongfully. Mavani and Maria M. Dakake suggest that Ali viewed the succession of Abu Bakr as a digression which turned into a full-blown deviation with the rebellion of Mu'awiya during his own caliphate. This is also the Shia view, as represented by the Shia jurist Ruhollah Khomeini.

Tribal politics

Banu Aws 
A question can be raised as to what enabled a handful of the Muhajirun to force their will upon the Ansar at the Saqifa. Ibn Ishaq and Caetani attribute this to an earlier collusion between the Muhajirun and the Banu Aws, the rival tribe of the Banu Khazraj among the Ansar. Madelung rejects this as unlikely but suggests that Usaid ibn Hudair, a chief of the Banu Aws, must have backed Abu Bakr at the Saqifa and carried with him the majority of the Aws, as also apparent from a related report by al-Tabari. Jafri likewise suggests that the deep-rooted enmity between the minority Banu Aws and the majority Banu Khazraj made it preferable for the former to instead submit to the Qurayshite rule. Momen has a similar opinion, and Ayoub regards the rivalry between the Banu Khazraj and the Banu Aws as the decisive factor in the appointment of Abu Bakr, who reportedly reminded the Ansar about this rivalry in the Saqifa account of the Sunni al-Jahiz, thus rekindling their pre-Islamic conflict, according to Ayoub.

Banu Khazraj 
The position of the Banu Khazraj was further weakened by internal rivalries, particularly between their chief Sa'd ibn Ubada and his cousin Bashr ibn Sa'd. The latter was among the first to break ranks and support Abu Bakr. Once an agreement over Abu Bakr was nearly reached, Jafri believes that the Khazraj found it unwise to lag behind and risk losing favor with the new ruler.

Banu Taym 
Jafri suggests that the rivalries among the larger clans within the Muhajirun made it easier for them to accept the rule of Abu Bakr, who belonged to the small clan of Banu Taym.

Banu Aslam 
Madelung and Caetani both hold that a decisive factor for Abu Bakr was the timely arrival of the Banu Aslam tribe in Medina with great numbers that filled the streets of Medina. The Banu Aslam tribe were known for their hostility towards the Ansar and readily supported Abu Bakr's bid for power. Umar would often point out, "It was only when I saw the Banu Aslam that I became certain of [our] victory." It is not known today whether this happened by chance or the Banu Aslam were tipped off about the Ansar's ambitions.

Banu Hashim

Jealousy 
Muhammad's clan, the Banu Hashim, and particularly his notable uncle Abbas supported the succession of Ali. Aslan suggests that the exclusion of Ali from the Saqifa affair was deliberate and reflected the fear among the Quraysh that combining the prophethood and the caliphate in the Banu Hashim would have made them too powerful. A conversation to this effect between the Hashemite Ibn Abbas and Umar is cited by Momen and Madelung. The former author voices a similar view to Aslan, while the latter acknowledges the "jealousy of the Quraysh," but believes that the simple logic of dynastic succession would have nevertheless prevailed in a broad  in favor of Ali. For Keaney, the Meccan elite were concerned that Ali's caliphate would have kept the future leadership of the community out of their hands and within the Banu Hashim.

Hereditary succession 
Lammens believes that Arabs disliked hereditary leadership while Madelung limits this attitude to Bedouin Arabs. Among the Quraysh, he argues, hereditary leadership was not uncommon, reflecting their belief that noble qualities were inherited. This view is echoed by Aslan. Afsaruddin and Sharon maintain that kinship was not a factor in early Islam whereas Amir-Moezzi and Mavani have challenged this point. In particular, Mavani writes that tribal values were deeply entrenched in the Arab society of that time, according to which kinship and noble lineage were the primary marks of identity and source of authority. Keaney believes that leadership was hereditary in the traditional Arab society and something that ran in families in a broad sense of the word. However, Ali was Muhammad's cousin and son-in-law which, he claims, carries little weight.

Ibn Ishaq and Ibn Hisham narrate that Umar in his speech famously said, "The oath of allegiance for Abu Bakr was a  [i.e., a precipitate and ill-considered deal], but God averted the evil of it." Alternatively, the Sunni al-Baladhuri quotes Umar in his Ansab as saying, "By God, the oath of allegiance for Abu Bakr was no ," adding that Muhammad had already designated Abu Bakr as his successor. Madelung rejects both of the reports by al-Baladhuri as highly unlikely.

Legitimacy 
Madelung suspects that Umar considered the Saqifa affair a  because it excluded from decision making the majority of the Muhajirun and particularly Muhammad's kin, whose participation was vital for a legitimate outcome. Possibly because of its questionable legal authority, Umar also warned Muslims in his speech against ever following the example of Saqifa. Similar concerns are raised by Abbas and Momen. Walker adds that Muhammad's relatives were disgruntled by Abu Bakr's hasty appointment which denied them a voice in the matter. 

Jafri notes the prominence of Abu Bakr but comments that his appointment was the decision of a group of companions, hastily forced upon others, and its success was due to the delicate group conflicts in Medina. Some contemporary authors have further criticized the Saqifa affair as a "backroom deal" and a "coup" which was heavily influenced by the pre-Islamic tribal politics.

Consolidation
Umar in his sermon asserted that "the necks of all Muslims were stretched [in obedience] for Abu Bakr," though Madelung considers it more likely that his authority was highly precarious at first. After the Saqifa meeting, Abu Bakr reportedly headed to the Prophet's Mosque and gave his inaugural speech there. Abbas and Hazleton comment that Muhammad was already buried by this time, with the exclusion of Abu Bakr from the funeral rites. With the help of the Banu Aslam and Banu Aws tribes, Umar is then said to have dominated the streets to secure the pledges of allegiance from the Medinans, according to Madelung. In chronological order, Abu Bakr obtained the backing of Uthman and of the Banu Umayyad, of Sa'd and Abd al-Rahman ibn Awf, of the Banu Zuhra, of Zubayr, and finally of Ali.

Ali's opposition 
Al-Baladhuri reports that the Banu Hashim and some companions gathered at Ali's house after learning about the appointment of Abu Bakr. Among them were Muhammad's uncle Abbas and Zubayr. These protesters held that Ali was the rightful successor to Muhammad, possibly referring to Muhammad's announcement at Ghadir Khumm. Miqdad, Salman, Abu Dharr, Talha were also among the companions who supported Ali's cause.

Threats against Ali 
Abu Bakr is said to have tasked Umar with securing Ali's pledge of allegiance. As noted by al-Tabari, the latter then led an armed mob to Ali's residence and threatened to set the house on fire if Ali and his supporters would not pledge their allegiance to Abu Bakr. The scene soon grew violent, but the mob retreated without Ali's pledge after his wife Fatima pleaded with them, as reported in the Sunni al-Imama wa al-siyasa. Alternatively, al-Baladhuri states that Ali capitulated and pledged allegiance to Abu Bakr immediately after Umar's threat. In contrast, the canonical Sahih al-Bukhari and Sahih Muslim relate that Ali pledged to Abu Bakr after Fatima died sometime later.

Boycott of Ali 
Madelung believes that Abu Bakr later placed a boycott on Ali and also on the Banu Hashim to abandon their support for Ali. As a result, prominent men ceased to speak to Ali, as related in a Sunni hadith attributed to Aisha. Those who initially supported Ali gradually turned away and pledged their allegiance to Abu Bakr, adds Jafri. At the same time, Ali turned down proposals to advance his claims by force, possibly for the unity of a nascent Islam.

Attack on Ali's house and his pledge 
While there is considerable uncertainty about the events, Ali most likely did not pledge allegiance to Abu Bakr until his wife Fatima died within six months of her father Muhammad, as reported by some canonical Sunni works. In Shia sources, the death (and miscarriage) of the young Fatima are attributed to an attack on her house to subdue Ali at the order of Abu Bakr. Sunnis categorically reject these allegations. After Fatima's death and in the absence of popular support, Ali is said to have relinquished his claims to the caliphate for the sake of the unity of a nascent Islam, which was facing internal and external threats, according to Mavani. In contrast with Muhammad's lifetime, Ali is believed to have retired from public life during the caliphates of Abu Bakr, Umar, and Uthman, which has been interpreted as a silent censure of the first three caliphs. While he reputedly advised Abu Bakr and Umar on government and religious matters, the mutual distrust and hostility of Ali with the two caliphs is well-documented, but largely downplayed or ignored in Sunni sources. Their differences were epitomized during the proceedings of the electoral council in 644 when Ali refused to be bound by the precedence of the first two caliphs. The charge that Ali pledged to Abu Bakr under duress appears also in al-Imama wa al-siyasa, sometimes attributed to Ibn Qutaybah but possibly written by another Sunni author in the Abbasid era. These conflicts after Muhammad's death are considered as the roots of the current division among Muslims. Those who accepted Abu Bakr's caliphate were later labeled Sunnis, while the supporters of Ali's right to caliphate went on to form the Shia.

See also
 Succession to Muhammad
List of Sahabah who did not give bay'ah to Abu Bakr
 Attack on Fatima's house

Notes

References

Sources

Further reading 
 

7th-century Islam
History of Islam